Alias is an American action, drama, thriller, and science fiction television series which debuted on September 30, 2001, on ABC. The series follows Jennifer Garner as Sydney Bristow, a double agent for the CIA working inside of the counter-government agency SD-6. The main theme of the series explores Sydney's obligation to conceal her true career from her friends and family, even as she assumes multiple aliases to carry out her missions. These themes are most prevalent in the first two seasons of the show. A major plotline of the series is the search for and recovery of artifacts created by Milo Rambaldi, a Renaissance-era character with similarities to both Leonardo da Vinci and Nostradamus. On May 22, 2006 the series completed its run, airing a total of 105 episodes over five seasons. An animated short was included on the DVD release of season 3. In addition to the individual season sets, the complete series was released on DVD with a bonus disc and a book that reveals the deepest secrets of the series, packaged in a "Rambaldi artifact box".

Series overview

Episodes

Season 1 (2001–02)

Season 2 (2002–03)

The Animated Alias: Tribunal
Jennifer Garner reprises her television role of CIA agent Sydney Bristow in this story that takes place between the second and third seasons of the live-action series. It is considered a "missing adventure" during a period Sydney later erases from her memory in which she works undercover as an assassin named "Julia Thorne." Despite how it was promoted in the teaser, the episode does not reveal anything that explains Sydney's missing time. It's merely a mission she undertook, and contains no background, or much information (not even about the mission portrayed). The events of this short are considered canonical with the live-action Alias series. This short film was originally produced for the DVD release of the third season as bonus feature.

Season 3 (2003–04)

Season 4 (2005)

Season 5 (2005–06)

References

External links

 

Alias
Alias